Tae-min is a Korean masculine given name. The meaning differs based on the hanja used to write each syllable of the name. There are 20 hanja with the reading "tae" and 27 hanja with the reading "min" on the South Korean government's official list of hanja which may be registered for use in given names.

People with this name include:

 Choi Tae-min (1912–1994), South Korean cult leader
 Kim Tae-min (born 1982), South Korean football player
 Lee Tae-min (born 1993), South Korean musician, member of Shinee
 Park Tae-min (born 1986), South Korean football player
 Park Tae-min (weightlifter), (born 1967) South Korean weightlifter

See also
 List of Korean given names

References

Korean masculine given names